Sebastian Müller (born 23 January 2001) is a German professional footballer who plays as a forward for  club Hallescher FC, on loan from Arminia Bielefeld.

Career
Müller played for the youth teams of 1. FC Schwalmstadt, SV 06 Alsfeld, TSG Wieseck and 1. FC Köln.

In January 2020, Müller joined 2. Bundesliga club Arminia Bielefeld, who were promoted to the Bundesliga at the end of the season. He made his professional debut for Arminia Bielefeld in the Bundesliga on 12 December 2020, coming on as a substitute in the 89th minute for Anderson Lucoqui against SC Freiburg. The away match finished as a 2–0 loss for Bielefeld.

On 1 February 2021, the last day of the 2020–21 winter transfer window, Müller moved to 2. Bundesliga side VfL Osnabrück on loan until summer 2022.

On 15 June 2022, Müller moved on a new loan to Hallescher FC in 3. Liga.

References

External links
 
 
 
 

2001 births
Living people
People from Schwalmstadt
Sportspeople from Kassel (region)
Footballers from Hesse
German footballers
Germany youth international footballers
Association football forwards
Arminia Bielefeld players
VfL Osnabrück players
Eintracht Braunschweig players
Hallescher FC players
Bundesliga players
2. Bundesliga players
3. Liga players